Kent Range is a range of mountains in Karkaraly District, Karaganda Region, Kazakhstan.

Part of the range is included in the Karkaraly National Park, a protected area established in 1998.

History
There are archaeological remains of an ancient city, dating back to the late Bronze Age in the Kent Mountains. 

There are also ruins allegedly belonging to a 17th century Buddhist lamasery of the time of Buddhism in Kazakhstan, the Kyzyl Kent site. The ruins are located in a small valley surrounded by rocky slopes.

Geography 
The Kent Range is one of the subranges of the Kazakh Upland system (Saryarka). It rises to the southeast of the Karkaraly Range. The Bakty Range rises  to the northeast, the Keshubai to the south, and Mount Ku  to the NNE. The larger Kyzyltas range rises to the southwest. 

Other important peaks are Dongal, Naizatas, Zhamantau and Bosaga. There are numerous rock formations within the area of the range.

Flora
The forested areas of the range are mostly located on the western side. They include pine, birch, aspen and willow. There is as well low vegetation made up of steppe shrubs and sedges.

See also
Buddhism in Central Asia
Geography of Kazakhstan

References

External links

Kent Mountains – a beautiful place in Central Kazakhstan
Visit Kazakhstan
Kazakh Uplands